Massachusetts is a U.S. state in New England. The music of Massachusetts has developed actively since it was first colonized by Britain. The city of Boston is an especially large part of the state's present music scene, which includes several genres of rock, as well as classical, folk, and hip hop music.

Indigenous music

Concert music 

Perhaps the most influential early composer of the United States was Lowell Mason. A native of Boston, Mason campaigned against the use of shape-note notation, and for the education in standard notation. He worked with local institutions to release collections of hymns and maintain his stature. Opposed to the shape-note tradition, Mason pushed American music towards a European model.

The Bay Psalm Book (The Whole Booke of Psalmes Faithfully Translated into English Metre) was published in Cambridge, Massachusetts, in 1640; it was the first book of any kind printed in the English colonies of North America. It became the standard used by New England churches for many years, though it contained no music itself, merely providing psalms and pointing readers to other prominent publications. The Bay Psalm Book was faithful to its source, but did not produce beautiful singing. In 1651, then, a third edition was created, and became known as the New England Psalm Book; this became the standard for many years. By this point, the evolution from the Ainsworth Psalter to the New England Psalm Book had steadily dwindled the number of tunes in use.

Massachusetts was later home to a number of the most prominent members of the First New England School of itinerant singing masters, including Daniel Read (later of New Haven, Connecticut) and Supply Belcher (later of Farmington, Maine).
Massachusetts is home to several formal ensembles: Boston Symphony Orchestra, Boston Pops Orchestra, Boston Lyric Opera, and Tanglewood Festival Chorus. Formal institutions for the perpetuation of formal music exist in the state as well: Boston Conservatory, Longy School of Music, New England Conservatory, and Berklee College of Music.

Choral music has been a major part of concert life with two of the oldest choral organizations in the United States based in Massachusetts: Stoughton Musical Society, founded in 1786, and Handel and Haydn Society, founded in 1815.

Sea shanties 

As Massachusetts has long maintained a great maritime tradition from the early colonial fishermen to its importance in the whaling industry in the nineteenth century, songs of the sea have been prominent in the state's musical heritage. Traditional English sea shanties were brought to New England and preserved by colonial American seamen. A New England version of the sea shanty "Spanish Ladies" changes 'England' to 'New England' or, in some versions, 'Boston' or 'New Bedford', and 'British sailors' to 'Yankee Whalermen'.

Folk music 
Folklorists who have collected traditional music of Massachusetts include Eloise Hubbard Linscott, whose field recordings from 1938 and 1941 are in the Library of Congress American Folklife Center.

A number of musicians with ties to the American folk music revival have Massachusetts connections. While a teenager living in Belmont, Joan Baez gave her first concert at the Club 47 in Cambridge. James Taylor was born in Boston, but later moved to North Carolina before once again relocating to Martha's Vineyard. He now lives in the town of Lenox. Paul Clayton from New Bedford, best known for his song "Gotta Travel On", was a minor figure in the folk revival. Both Bill Staines, who grew up in Lexington, and Bonnie Raitt, who attended college in Cambridge, were influenced by the folk revival through the concerts at Club 47.

The diverse contemporary Massachusetts folk music scene includes musicians such as David Coffin, who specializes in early music and sea music; Lui Collins, a folk singer-songwriter; Vance Gilbert, a folk singer with a background in jazz; and Aoife Clancy, formerly of Cherish the Ladies, who sings traditional Irish and contemporary folk songs. It also includes Ellis Paul, a singer-songwriter who came onto the Boston music scene in the late 1980s after arriving at Boston College on a track scholarship. Since then he has been the recipient of 14 Boston Music Awards.

According to the New England Folk Network Web site, Massachusetts hosts more than a dozen annual folk music festivals. Of these, the Lowell Folk Festival claims to be the biggest free folk festival in the United States, while the New England Folk Festival, which began in 1944, may be the longest-running festival in the state. Festivals may include folk music from a wide diversity of cultures. For example, the 2007 New England Folk Festival included Bulgarian, Japanese, and Swedish music, and the 2007 Working Waterfront Festival included Portuguese fado music and Mexican norteño.

Jazz 

Jazz musicians born in Massachusetts include pianist and composer Irene Higginbotham, multi-instrumentalist Jaki Byard, multi-instrumentalist Bill Dixon, saxophonist and clarinetist Harry Carney, bassist Teddy Kotick, pianist Barbara Carroll, pianist Ralph Burns, keyboardist Chick Corea, trumpeter Max Kaminsky, tenor saxophonist Paul Gonsalves, alto saxophonists Johnny Hodges and Phil Woods, singer Nnenna Freelon, multi-instrumentalist Teddy Charles, drummer and vibraphonist Johnny Rae, pianist Ran Blake, soprano saxophonist and composer Jane Ira Bloom, drummer Terri Lyne Carrington, and saxophonist Carol Sudhalter.

Pat Metheny, though originally from the midwest, has spent most of his career based in Massachusetts.

R&B 
Doo-wop group The G-Clefs were from Roxbury.  The Tune Weavers formed in Woburn.

Jonzun Crew was an electro and early funk–hip hop group that was active in the 1980s in Boston.

The R&B group New Edition is from the Roxbury neighborhood of Boston.  Masspike Miles is also from Roxbury.

Hip-hop 
Massachusetts has produced a number of notable hip-hop artists since the birth of hip-hop, including:

Bell Biv DeVoe
Cousin Stizz
Ed O.G.
Gang Starr
Joyner Lucas
New Edition
Statik Selektah

Rock 

The Remains and The Rockin' Ramrods formed in Boston.  The Barbarians formed in Cape Cod and The Shames formed in Ipswich.

The Modern Lovers, featuring Jonathan Richman, David Robinson (later of The Cars), and (for a short time) Jerry Harrison of Talking Heads, came out of Boston, as did more mainstream acts like Aerosmith, The Cars, and Boston. The J. Geils Band formed at Worcester Polytechnic Institute, before adding Peter Wolf and Stephen Jo Bladd from Boston band The Hallucinations to the lineup.

Paul Pena was born in Hyannis and attended Clark University in Worcester. He played gigs at the Holden experiment with Bonnie Raitt and other Worcester folkies. He went on to play with T. Bone Walker and wrote the 1970s Steve Miller Band hit "Jet Airliner".

The Real Kids formed in 1972.  From the North Shore were the Nervous Eaters who formed in 1977.  They were managed by The Rathskeller in Kenmore Square and released two 45s on the club's RAT label.

Alternative rock 

The earliest alternative rock bands in Massachusetts hailed from Boston and included Salem 66, The Neighborhoods, The Neats, Uzi, Volcano Suns, Human Sexual Response, La Peste, and Mission of Burma. Later bands from eastern Massachusetts included Pixies, Morphine, Galaxie 500, Swirlies, and the Pernice Brothers. Farther west, in Amherst, the dissolution of the legendary hardcore punk band Deep Wound spurred the foundation of future legends Sebadoh and Dinosaur Jr. from its ashes. Amherst and neighboring Northampton also spawned the Scud Mountain Boys, Buffalo Tom, and Lo Fine.

Other notable rock bands and musicians include:

 Adam Granduciel
 A Loss for Words
 All That Remains
 Aloud
 American Hi-Fi
 Apollo Sunshine
 A Rocket to the Moon
 Bang Camaro
 Belly
 Big D and the Kids Table
 Billy Squier
 Blake Babies
 Tracy Bonham
 Boston
 Boys Like Girls
 Chucklehead
 Come
 Converge
 Cul de Sac
 Dick Dale
 Dispatch
 Dream Theater
 Dropkick Murphys
 Drop Nineteens
 Ed's Redeeming Qualities
 Energy
 Extreme
 Face to Face
 Figures on a Beach
 Four Year Strong
 The Freeze
 Godsmack
 Guster
 Hallelujah the Hills
 Juliana Hatfield
 Helium
 Highly Suspect
 Human Sexual Response
 Ice Nine Kills
 Jaya the Cat
 Jim's Big Ego
 Kicked in the Head
 Killswitch Engage
 Letters to Cleo
 Lo Fine
 Lyres
 Orpheus
 Outpatients
 Amanda Palmer
 Passion Pit
 Piebald
 Powerman 5000
 PVRIS
 Revocation
 Rob Zombie
 Scruffy The Cat
 Shadows Fall
 Speedy Ortiz
 Staind
 State Radio
 Street Dogs
 Sunburned Hand of the Man
 Swirlies
 'Til Tuesday
 The Blackjacks
 The Click Five
 The Del Fuegos
 The Dogmatics
 The Dresden Dolls
 The Ducky Boys
 The Fools
 The Hotelier
 The Lemonheads
 The Magnetic Fields
 The Mighty Mighty Bosstones
 The Push Stars
 The Receiving End of Sirens
 The Sheila Divine
 The Stompers
 Therefore I Am
 The Unband
 They Might Be Giants
 Transit
 Tribe
 Vanna
 The Venetia Fair
 Westbound Train
 Will Dailey

Musicians from Massachusetts with a #1 Billboard Hot 100 hit include: Donna Summer (d.2012) 4 #1 disco hits from '78-'79 (like "Hot Stuff)"; New Kids on the Block 3 #1 hits (like "Step by Step"); Aerosmith ("I Don't Want to Miss a Thing"), Boston ("Amanda"), The J. Geils Band ("Centerfold"), Extreme ("More Than Words"), Bobby Brown ("My Prerogative"), Marky Mark and the Funky Bunch ("Good Vibrations"), and Meghan Trainor ("All About That Bass" in 2014). Aerosmith co-lead guitarist Brad Whitford graduated from the Berklee College of Music in Boston in 1971. 'Til Tuesday lead singer Aimee Mann also attended Berklee. Boston guitarist and founder Tom Scholz graduated from Massachusetts Institute of Technology.

See also 
 List of songs about Boston

References 
 Blush, Steven. (2001). American Hardcore: A Tribal History. Los Angeles, CA: Feral House. .
 Most, Doug. (2013). "Boston Globe: Emerson’s WERS cancels ‘Rockers’ and ‘88.9@night’. Boston, MA:

External links 
 Connecticut/MA Music – Western Massachusetts Music News
 American Music Preservation – Massachusetts Music
 New England Folk Network
 New England Music Exchange Network
 New England Open Mic E-zine with listings
 Surf For Local Music E-zine with listings
 The Bay State Hotel (Northampton) -- a music scene memorial
 Boston University School of Music Events
 Boston Conservatory Events
 Berklee College of Music Events

 
Massachusetts culture
Massachusetts
Massachusetts